The 1925 Columbia Lions football team was an American football team that represented Columbia University as an independent during the 1925 college football season. In its first season under head coach Charles Crowley, the team compiled a 6–3–1 record and outscored opponents  with five shutouts.  The team played its home games at Baker Field (seven games) and the Polo Grounds (two games), both located in Upper Manhattan.

Schedule

References

Columbia
Columbia Lions football seasons
Columbia Lions football